Gerrit Marx is a German manager. Since the spin-off of Iveco Group from CNH Industrial on January 1, 2022, Marx serves as Chief Executive Officer of the newly formed holding company.

Biography

Gerrit Marx holds a degree in Mechanical Engineering (“Diplom Ingenieur”), an MBA (“Diplom Kaufmann”) from RWTH Aachen University, and a Doctorate in Business Administration from Cologne University.

From 1999 to 2007, Marx worked at McKinsey & Company on improvement programs for automotive and aerospace in Europe, Brazil, and Japan.

He joined Daimler AG in 2007 to head the global controlling function for vehicle and powertrain component projects, as well as market-entry/M&A in North America, Europe and Asia. He was then President and CEO at Daimler Trucks China in 2009 and, subsequently, President of Skoda China at Volkswagen AG.

In 2012, Gerrit Marx joined the European leadership team of Bain Capital as a member of their portfolio group. During his tenure at Bain, he was interim CEO of Wittur Group.

Marx joined CNH Industrial in 2019 as President of Commercial and Specialty Vehicles.

Since January 1, 2022, Marx is chief executive officer of Iveco Group.

References

German chief executives
Living people
Year of birth missing (living people)
German business executives
McKinsey & Company people
Bain Capital people
RWTH Aachen University alumni